Nowjeh Deh-e Sheykhlar (also Romanized as Nowjeh Deh-e Sheykhlar, Nowjeh Deh Sheykhlar, and Nowjeh Deh-ye Sheykhlar; also known as Nojeh Deh Shīkhlar, Nuvedi, Sheykhlar, and Sheykhlar Noqadī) is a village in Dowlatabad Rural District, in the Central District of Marand County, East Azerbaijan Province, Iran. At the 2006 census, its population was 303, in 68 families.

References 

Populated places in Marand County